The 1985 All-Ireland Senior Football Championship Final was the 98th All-Ireland Final and the deciding match of the 1985 All-Ireland Senior Football Championship, an inter-county Gaelic football tournament for the top teams in Ireland.

The final was contested by Dublin and Kerry. The teams would not meet in an All-Ireland Senior Football Championship Final again until 2011.

Pre-match
On the morning of the game, Kerry manager Mick O'Dwyer and his players featured in an advertisement for Bendix washing machines, with the line "Only Bendix could whitewash this lot".

Match

Summary
Kerry led by nine points at half-time and two Joe McNally goals in the second half was not enough to stop them.

Jack O'Shea picked the ball with his hands directly from the ground (a foul) in front of referee Paddy Kavanagh.

It was the fourth of five All-Ireland football titles won by Kerry in the 1980s.

Details

References

All-Ireland Senior Football Championship Final
All-Ireland Senior Football Championship Final, 1985
All-Ireland Senior Football Championship Finals
All-Ireland Senior Football Championship Finals
Dublin county football team matches
Kerry county football team matches